Injury Reserve is an American hip hop group formed in 2013 in Tempe, Arizona by rappers Stepa J. Groggs (Jordan Groggs), Ritchie with a T (Nathaniel Ritchie), and producer Parker Corey.

History

2013–2014: Career beginnings, Depth Chart and Cooler Colors 

Injury Reserve was formed in 2013 by producer Parker Corey and rappers Stepa J. Groggs, and Ritchie with a T after Groggs was featured on Ritchie's mixtape produced by Corey. Ritchie first met Corey through a mutual friend in high school after looking for producers, and met Groggs in middle school when Groggs was working at a Foot Locker store in Phoenix.

In 2013, the group released Depth Chart, their 15-track debut concept mixtape. There was a music video released for "Harvey Dent" to promote the project. Most tracks were based on the premise of a basketball player being drafted. It was released through digital platforms such as Audiomack, but was delisted after the subsequent media attention from 2015's Live from the Dentist Office. It was a relatively unknown release with very little press or media attention, garnering them not much of an audience.

In 2014, the group released Cooler Colors, a 7-track EP, led by singles, "Black Sheep", "Groundhog Day", and "How Bout You". It was released through digital platforms such as Audiomack, but was delisted in the same fashion as Depth Chart. The group doesn't refer to these projects as their debuts, and instead refers to Live from the Dentist Office as their debut.

2015–2016: Live from the Dentist Office and Floss 
In 2015, the group self-released Live from the Dentist Office, their 11-track breakout mixtape with features from Chuck Inglish, Curtis Williams, Glass Popcorn, and Demi Hughes. The mixtape was released through multiple digital platforms such as SoundCloud, iTunes, Tidal, and Spotify. Physical copies of the project were later sold through Injury Reserve's online store. Live from the Dentist Office generally received acclaim from music critics. 

On December 15, 2016, Injury Reserve released their second mixtape titled Floss, released again through a variety of digital platforms to similar acclaim. The mixtape featured Vic Mensa and Cakes da Killa. Both projects were actually recorded in a dental office belonging to producer Parker Corey's grandfather.

2017–2019: Drive It Like It's Stolen, signing to Loma Vista, Injury Reserve 
On September 29, 2017, the group released an EP titled Drive It Like It's Stolen, preceded by the singles, "North Pole" (featuring Austin Feinstein), "See You Sweat", and "Boom (X3)". All of the singles were released with accompanying music videos. They joined Ho99o9 and The Underachievers on separate tours in 2017. In 2018, the group embarked on their first headlining tour, accompanied by Baltimore artist Freddie Gibbs for its second half, and were featured on the Aminé single "Campfire". 

On September 6, 2018, the group released a statement through their social media, stating they signed a record label with Loma Vista, helmed by A&R, Kyambo "Hip Hop" Joshua, and they'd be releasing their debut album under the label. On May 17, 2019, the group released their self-titled debut album to generally favorable reviews. Following their debut album, the group embarked on a world headlining tour.

2020–present: Death of Stepa J. Groggs, By the Time I Get to Phoenix, future of group 
Stepa J. Groggs died on June 29, 2020, at age 32. The group announced his death on their Twitter account, mourning "a loving father, life partner and friend." No cause of death has been released. Since Groggs's death, the group has been featured on songs by Dos Monos, Tony Velour and Aminé.

On September 15, 2021, the group self-released their second studio album, By the Time I Get to Phoenix, led by the singles, "Knees", and "Superman That". The album features Bruiser Brigade rapper ZelooperZ, and was engineered by Zeroh. Shortly following the release, the group embarked on a worldwide tour, alongside Slauson Malone and Colloboh on the US leg. Initially, Zeroh was the supporting act alongside Slauson Malone, but was replaced with Colloboh due to unforeseen circumstances.

In an interview with Huck Magazine, interviewer Thomas Hobbs asked Ritchie with a T if the group could continue without Stepa J. Groggs, responding that, "I can imagine him joking and saying: 'Y'all better still do this shit!'. But then I can also imagine him saying: 'You better not step on a stage without me!'. We're still figuring it out... We've not had an explicit conversation about continuing the group, but me and Parker will continue to create together [in some capacity]."

On September 28, 2022, the group released a remix of "Ghost" by experimental pop musician, Body Meat, marking their first release since By the Time I Get to Phoenix in 2021.

Members 

 Ritchie with a T – vocals, recording 
 Parker Corey – production

Former members 

 Stepa J. Groggs – vocals

Discography

Albums

Mixtapes

Extended plays

Guest appearances

Tours 
Headlining

 Injury Reserve Arena Tour (2018)
 Injury Reserve World Tour (2019)
 By the Time I Get TOuring (2021)
 North American leg (2021)
 European leg (2022)
 Australian leg (2022)
 Injury Reserve & Armand Hammer & AKAI SOLO Joint Tour (2022)

Supporting

 Ho99o9 – United States of Ho99o9 Tour (2017)
 The Underachievers – Renaissance Tour (2017)
 black midi – West Coast North America Tour (2022)
 IDLES – Crawler Tour (2022)

References

Alternative hip hop groups
Musical groups established in 2013
Musical groups from Tempe, Arizona
Rappers from Arizona
West Coast hip hop groups
2013 establishments in Arizona